Crystal is an unincorporated community in Mercer County, West Virginia, United States.

The community most likely derives its name from the Crystal Coal and Coke Company.

References

Unincorporated communities in Mercer County, West Virginia
Unincorporated communities in West Virginia
Coal towns in West Virginia